Tono, Tōno or Toño may refer to:

Places
 Tōnō, the southeastern portion of Gifu Prefecture, Japan
 Tōno, Iwate, a city in Iwate Prefecture, Japan
 Tono, Washington, a ghost town in the state of Washington, United States
 Tono Dam, agricultural dams in Ghana
 Tono River, a river in Oecussi, East Timor
 Tōno Station, a Kamaishi Line railway station in Tōno, Iwate, Japan
 Pasar Tono, a town in Oecussi-Ambeno, East Timor

People
Tono (name)

Literature
 Tono-Bungay, a 1909 novel by H.G. Wells
 Tōno Monogatari, a collection of folk tales from the Tōno, Iwate, Japan area, collected by Kunio Yanagita

Other uses
 Tono, a Japanese honorific, see Japanese honorifics#Dono / tono
 Tonos, an accent mark used in the Greek alphabet
 Tono humano, one of the main genres of 17th Century Spanish and Portuguese music
 TONO, a Norwegian corporation that administers copyrights for music in Norway
Recto tono, Latin phrase related to church liturgy and music
 Tono to Issho, Japanese manga

See also

Ton (disambiguation)
 Toon (disambiguation)